Ywathit is a town in Mohnyin Township in Kachin State of Myanmar. It is on the road between Hopin and Indawgyi Lake.

External links
"Ywathit Map — Satellite Images of Ywathit" Maplandia.com

Township capitals of Myanmar
Populated places in Kachin State